The 1984 NHL Entry Draft was the 22nd NHL Entry Draft. It took place on June 9, 1984, at the Montreal Forum in Montreal, Quebec.

The 1984 Entry Draft is noted for the unusually high number of future Hall of Famers picked, particularly in lower rounds. In addition to Mario Lemieux being taken first overall, Patrick Roy was chosen in the third round, Brett Hull in the sixth, and Luc Robitaille in the ninth.  In addition, Lemieux, Gary Suter and Robitaille would all go on to win the Calder Memorial Trophy, Lemieux in 1985, Suter in 1986, and Robitaille in 1987, making this a rare draft in which multiple Rookie of the Year winners were produced.

The surprise at the time of the draft was Montreal's selection of Petr Svoboda at fifth-overall. As a player trained behind the Iron Curtain, very few people expected him to be available for selection in the draft, let alone be actually attending the draft and coming to the podium when his name was announced, as he had only recently defected to West Germany following the 1984 WJHC (only Serge Savard, the then-GM of the Canadiens, had been aware of Svoboda's defection).

In addition to Svoboda, of note is that Tom Glavine, playing centre in high school, who later became a star Major League Baseball pitcher with more than 300 career wins, as well as a 2014 inductee of the Baseball Hall of Fame was chosen in the fourth round (69th overall) by the Los Angeles Kings, ahead of notable players such as future Hall of Famers Brett Hull (117th overall), and Luc Robitaille (171st overall).

Another special fact from this draft is the fact that the Montreal Canadiens, with their last pick, drafted Troy Crosby, the father of Sidney Crosby.

The last active player in the NHL from this draft class was Gary Roberts, who retired after the 2008–09 season.

Selections by round
Below are listed the selections in the 1984 NHL Entry Draft. Club teams are located in North America unless otherwise noted.

Round one

 The Los Angeles Kings' first-round pick went to the Chicago Black Hawks as the result of a trade on June 9, 1984 that sent Bob Janecyk, Chicago's first-round, third-round and fourth-round picks in 1984 NHL Entry Draft to Los Angeles in exchange for Los Angeles's fourth-round pick in 1984 NHL Entry Draft and this pick.
 The Hartford Whalers' first-round pick went to the Montreal Canadiens as the result of a trade on December 21, 1981 that sent Pierre Larouche, Montreal's first-round pick in 1984 NHL Entry Draft and third-round pick in 1985 NHL Entry Draft to Hartford in exchange for Hartford's second-round pick in 1984 NHL Entry Draft, third-round pick in 1985 NHL Entry Draft and this pick.
 The Chicago Black Hawks' first-round pick went to the Los Angeles as the result of a trade on June 9, 1984 that sent Los Angeles' first-round and fourth-round picks in 1984 NHL Entry Draft to Chicago in exchange for Bob Janecyk, Chicago's third-round, fourth-round picks in 1984 NHL Entry Draft and this pick.
 The St. Louis Blues' first-round pick went to the Montreal Canadiens as the result of a trade on June 9, 1984 that sent Rick Wamsley, Montreal's two second-round (pick #26 & pick #32) and third-round picks in 1984 NHL Entry Draft to St. Louis in exchange for St. Louis' second-round pick in 1984 NHL Entry Draft and this pick.
 The Winnipeg Jets' first-round pick went to the Pittsburgh Penguins as the result of a trade on March 5, 1984 that sent Randy Carlyle to Winnipeg in exchange for future considerations (Moe Mantha Jr.) and this pick.
 The Montreal Canadiens' first-round pick went to the Hartford Whalers as the result of a trade on December 21, 1981 that sent Hartford's first-round and second-round pick in 1984 NHL Entry Draft with a third-round pick in 1985 NHL Entry Draft in exchange for Pierre Larouche, Montreal's third-round pick in 1985 NHL Entry Draft and this pick.
 The Philadelphia Flyers' first-round pick went to the Pittsburgh Penguins as the result of a trade on October 23, 1983 that sent Rich Sutter, Pittsburgh's 2nd-rd pick and 3rd-rd picks in 1984 NHL Entry Draft in exchange for Andy Brickley, Ron Flockhart, Mark Taylor Philadelphia's 3rd-rd pick in 1984 NHL Entry Draft and this pick.

Round two

 The Pittsburgh Penguins' second-round pick went to the Philadelphia Flyers as the result of a trade on October 23, 1983 that sent Andy Brickley, Ron Flockhart, Mark Taylor, Philadelphia's 1st-rd and 3rd-rd picks in 1984 NHL Entry Draft to Pittsburgh in exchange for Rich Sutter, Pittsburgh's 3rd-rd pick in 1984 NHL Entry Draft and this pick.
 The Montreal Canadiens' second-round pick went to the St. Louis Blues as the result of a trade on June 9, 1984 that sent St. Louis' first-round and second-round picks in 1984 NHL Entry Draft to Montreal in exchange for Rick Wamsley, Montreal's second-round pick (32nd overall) and third-round pick in 1984 NHL Entry Draft along with this pick.
 Montreal previously acquired this pick as the result of a trade on December 21, 1981 that sent that sent Pierre Larouche, Montreal's first-round pick in 1984 NHL Entry Draft and third-round pick in 1985 NHL Entry Draft to Hartford in exchange for Hartford's first-round pick in 1984 NHL Entry Draft, third-round pick in 1985 NHL Entry Draft and this pick.
 The Chicago Black Hawks' second-round pick went to the Philadelphia Flyers as the result of a trade on June 8, 1983 that sent Behn Wilson to  Chicago in exchange for Doug Crossman and this pick.
 The St. Louis Blues' second-round pick went to the Montreal Canadiens as the result of a trade on June 9, 1984 that sent Rick Wamsley, Montreal's two second-round (pick #26 & pick #32) and third-round picks in 1984 NHL Entry Draft to St. Louis in exchange for St. Louis' first-round pick in 1984 NHL Entry Draft and this pick.
 The Montreal Canadiens' second-round pick went to the St. Louis Blues as the result of a trade on June 9, 1984 that sent St. Louis' first-round and second-round picks in 1984 NHL Entry Draft to Montreal in exchange for Rick Wamsley, Montreal's second-round pick (26th overall) and third-round pick in 1984 NHL Entry Draft along with this pick.
 The Minnesota North Stars' second-round pick went to the Washington Capitals as the result of a trade on July 5, 1983 that sent Dennis Maruk to Minnesota in exchange for this pick.
 The Washington Capitals' second-round pick went to the Calgary Flames as the result of a trade on June 9, 1982 that sent Ken Houston and Pat Riggin to Washington in exchange for Howard Walker, George White, Washington's sixth-round pick in 1982 NHL Entry Draft, third-round pick in 1983 NHL Entry Draft and this pick.

Round three

 The Pittsburgh Penguins' third-round pick went to the Philadelphia Flyers as the result of a trade on October 23, 1983 that sent Andy Brickley, Ron Flockhart, Mark Taylor, Philadelphia's 1st-rd and 3rd-rd picks in 1984 NHL Entry Draft to Pittsburgh in exchange for Rich Sutter, Pittsburgh's 2nd-rd pick in 1984 NHL Entry Draft and this pick.
 The Los Angeles Kings' third-round pick went to the Chicago Black Hawks as the result of a trade on October 24, 1982 that sent the Terry Ruskowski to Los Angeles in exchange for Larry Goodenough and this pick.
 The Montreal Canadiens' third-round pick went to the Minnesota North Stars as the result of a trade on October 28, 1983 that sent the Bobby Smith to Montreal in exchange for Keith Acton, Mark Napier and this pick.
 Montreal previously acquired this pick as the result of a trade on December 17, 1982 that sent Dan Daoust to Toronto in exchange for this pick.
 The Chicago Black Hawks' first-round pick went to the Los Angeles as the result of a trade on June 9, 1984 that sent Los Angeles' first-round and fourth-round picks in 1984 NHL Entry Draft to Chicago in exchange for Bob Janecyk, Chicago's first-round, fourth-round picks in 1984 NHL Entry Draft and this pick.
 The Winnipeg Jets' third-round pick went to the Montreal Canadiens as the result of a trade on November 4, 1983 that sent the Robert Picard to Winnipeg in exchange for this pick.
 The Montreal Canadiens' third-round pick went to the St. Louis Blues as the result of a trade on June 9, 1984 that sent St. Louis' first-round and second-round picks in 1984 NHL Entry Draft to Montreal in exchange for Rick Wamsley, Montreal's two second-round pick (26th and 32nd overall) and with this pick.
 The Calgary Flames' third-round pick went to the Montreal Canadiens as the result of a trade on September 10, 1982 that sent the Doug Risebrough and Montreal's second-round pick in 1983 NHL Entry Draft to Calgary in exchange for Calgary's second-round pick in 1983 NHL Entry Draft and this pick.
 The Minnesota North Stars' third-round pick went to the Vancouver Canucks as the result of a trade on October 20, 1983 that sent the Lars Lindgren to Minnesota in exchange for this pick.
 The New York Rangers' third-round pick went to the St. Louis Blues as the result of a trade on March 5, 1984 that sent the Larry Patey and the rights to Bob Brooke to the Rangers in exchange for Dave Barr, cash and this pick.
 The Pittsburgh Penguins' third-round pick went to the Vancouver Canucks as the result of a trade on January 26, 1984 that sent the Kevin McCarthy to Pittsburgh in exchange for this pick.
 Pittsburgh previously acquired this pick as the result of a trade with the Philadelphia Flyers on October 23, 1983 that sent Rich Sutter, Pittsburgh's 2nd-rd pick and 3rd-rd picks in 1984 NHL Entry Draft in exchange for Andy Brickley, Ron Flockhart, Mark Taylor Philadelphia's 1st-rd pick in 1984 NHL Entry Draft and this pick.

Round four

 The New Jersey Devils' fourth-round pick went to the Montreal Canadiens as the result of a trade on March 10, 1981 that sent Bill Baker to Colorado in exchange for New Jersey's third-round pick in 1983 NHL Entry Draft and Montreal's option to swap fourth-round picks in this year's draft (this pick, New Jersey gets pick # 74).  Colorado relocated to New Jersey on May 27, 1982.
 The Los Angeles Kings' first-round pick went to the Chicago Black Hawks as the result of a trade on June 9, 1984 that sent Bob Janecyk, Chicago's first-round, third-round and fourth-round picks in 1984 NHL Entry Draft to Los Angeles in exchange for Los Angeles's first-round pick in 1984 NHL Entry Draft and this pick.
 The Hartford Whalers' fourth-round pick went to the Winnipeg Jets as the result of a trade on July 4, 1983 that sent Norm Dupont to Hartford in exchange for this pick.
 The Chicago Black Hawks' first-round pick went to the Los Angeles as the result of a trade on June 9, 1984 that sent Los Angeles' first-round and fourth-round picks in 1984 NHL Entry Draft to Chicago in exchange for Bob Janecyk, Chicago's first-round, third-round picks in 1984 NHL Entry Draft and this pick.
 The Los Angeles Kings' fourth-round pick went to the New York Islanders as the result of a trade on November 17, 1983 that sent Mike McEwen to Los Angeles in exchange for this pick.
 Los Angeles previously acquired this pick as the result of a trade on June 8, 1983 that sent Los Angeles' fourth-round pick in 1983 NHL Entry Draft to Detroit in exchange for this pick.
 The Montreal Canadiens' fourth-round pick went to the New Jersey Devils as the result of a trade on March 10, 1981 that sent New Jersey's third-round pick in 1983 NHL Entry Draft and Montreal's option to swap fourth-round picks in this year's draft (pick # 65) in exchange for Bill Baker and this pick.  Colorado relocated to New Jersey on May 27, 1982.

Round five

 The Hartford Whalers' fifth-round pick went to the Minnesota North Stars as the result of a trade on October 1, 1982 that sent Kent-Erik Andersson and Mark Johnson to Hartford in exchange for Jordy Douglas and this pick.
 The Quebec Nordiques' fifth-round pick went to the Winnipeg Jets as the result of a trade on February 6, 1984 that sent Jimmy Mann to Quebec in exchange for this pick.
 The Washington Capitals' fifth-round pick went to the Chicago Black Hawks as the result of a trade on August 24, 1982 that sent Ted Bulley and Dave Hutchison to Washington in exchange for Washington's 6th-rd pick in 1983 NHL Entry Draft and this pick.

Round six

 The Pittsburgh Penguins' sixth-round pick went to the Edmonton Oilers as the result of a trade on December 5, 1983 that sent Tom Roulston to Pittsburgh in exchange for Kevin McClelland and this pick.

Round seven

Round eight

 The Pittsburgh Penguins' eighth-round pick went to the St. Louis Blues as the result of a trade on February 14, 1981 that had Pittsburgh right to claim Gary Edwards off waivers from Blues without having to pay a cash waiver price in exchange for this pick.
 The Hartford Whalers' eighth-round pick went to the Detroit Red Wings as the result of a trade on May 29, 1984 that sent Brad Shaw in exchange for this pick.

Round nine

 The Edmonton Oilers' ninth-round pick went to the New York Rangers as the result of a trade on January 20, 1984 that sent Rick Chartraw to Edmonton in exchange for this pick.

Round ten

Round eleven

 The Quebec Nordiques' eleventh-round pick went to the Chicago Black Hawks as the result of a trade on June 8, 1983 that sent Chicago's twelfth-round pick in 1983 NHL Entry Draft to Quebec in exchange for this pick.

Round twelve

Draftees based on nationality

Hall of Famers
 Mario Lemieux
 Brett Hull
 Luc Robitaille
 Patrick Roy
 Tom Glavine (Baseball Hall of Fame)

See also
 1984–85 NHL season
 List of NHL players

References

External links
 1984 NHL Entry Draft player stats at The Internet Hockey Database

Draft
National Hockey League Entry Draft